Jean-Claude Petit (born 14 November 1943) is a French composer and arranger, born in Vaires-sur-Marne. After accompanying jazzmen in his childhood, Petit went to the Conservatoire de Paris, where he studied harmony and counterpoint. He did the string arrangements for Mink DeVille's Le Chat Bleu album, as well as orchestrating the backing parts to some French pop singles in the mid-to-late 1960s, including those of Erick Saint-Laurent and yé-yé girls Christine Pilzer and Monique Thubert.

In 1973 he composed La leçon de Michette. The song was popular in Italy due to its use in the soundtrack of a well-known Carosello (the Italian TV spot broadcast) from 1973 to 1976.

As a music ghostwriter for director Michel Magne, Petit did not get credit for his film scores until he was 36.  

1979 saw his first major film soundtrack commission (Alexandro Jodorowsky's Tusk), but he had been releasing solo records at least a decade earlier, including at least four for the Chappell Music Library, as well as his album Chez Jean-Claude Petit, released in the early 1970s. In 1976 he collaborated with Pierre Delanoë, Toto Cutugno, Vito Pallavicini in a very popular and funky music for Mireille Mathieu called Ciao Bambino, Sorry. In addition, he was a frequent collaborator with French film music composer Jack Arel: the pair's most well-known production, "Psychedelic Portrait", was featured in an episode of the cult TV series The Prisoner. His scores for The Return of the Musketeers (1989) and Cyrano de Bergerac (1990) remain perhaps his best known work internationally. In 1995 he was nominated for a Victoire de la Musique award in soundtrack of the year for L'Etudiante Etranger.  Jean Claude conducted and arranged for American Orchestra leader Billy Vaughn in the 1970s:  At least two of Billy's Paramount LPs "An Old Fashioned Love Song" PAS 6025  and "Greatest Country Hits"  give Jean Claude credit as arranged/conductor.  The 'Greatest Country Hits' Lp Paramount PAS 6044 also includes a Jean Claude original "Walk A Country Mile".

Filmography

 1979: Tusk
 1982: Lively Social Life
 1985: Tranches de vie
 1985: Billy-Ze One-Kick
 1986: Jean de Florette
 1986: Manon des Sources
 1987: Fucking Fernand
 1988: Savannah
 1989: The Return of the Musketeers
 1990: Cyrano de Bergerac (Colosseum CST 34.8046)
 1990: Uranus
 1991: Always Alone
 1991: Mayrig
 1992: 588, Street Paradises
 1992: The Zebra
 1992: The Playboys
 1993: Lady Chatterley
 1994: In Antonin Company Artaud
 1995: The Horseman on the Roof
 1996: Beaumarchais The Insolent One
 1997: Messieurs les enfants
 1998: Paddy
 2000: Lumumba
 2002: Like Your Father
 2004: Podium
 2007: Dance With Him

References

External links
 
 Jean-Claude Petit discography at Rateyourmusic.com

French film score composers
French male film score composers
1943 births
Living people
People from Seine-et-Marne
Eurovision Song Contest conductors
21st-century conductors (music)
21st-century French male musicians
Best Original Music BAFTA Award winners